Phoenix Marketcity is a shopping mall developed by Phoenix Mills Limited, located in Pune, Maharashtra. It was opened in June 2011 and is one of the largest malls in India, with a retail area of 1.19 million square feet. It is located in the Vimannagar area of Pune.

Phoenix Marketcity has five floors of retail space and several features such as a retail zone, a food court with fine dining restaurants and quick service restaurants and a nine-screen PVR Cinemas.

Location
Phoenix Marketcity Pune is located in Viman Nagar, an area in the East of Pune with connectivity to the city, to the airport, the railway station and the upcoming Ramwadi metro station which barely 0.3 km from the mall.

Size and outlets
Phoenix Marketcity Pune has a total gross leasable area of 1.19 Million sq. ft. It is a multi-level building with more than 350 retail outlets, more than 2500 parking spaces, over 50 restaurants and cafés, 40 luxury stores and 50 flagship stores.

Features

 Liberty Square: Planned space with an open arena of 10,000 sq. ft for alfresco dining, concerts and outdoor events
 Family Leisure Activity Areas/Games: Happy Planet and Fun City are two popular areas within the Phoenix Marketcity offering fun activities and games for families.
 Food Court: A large area with dedicated space for dine-in restaurants, cafes and outlets serving food 
 Movies: Phoenix Marketcity has PVR Cinemas for movie screenings   
 Events: Phoenix Marketcity hosts theme events, fests, concerts on the big stage as well as in the restaurants. The entertainment comprises cosplays to live musical nights to live comedy shows, with popular celebrities gracing the event.

Mall Services

In-Mall Services
 24 hour-on-site security
 Information desk
 Digital directory
 Helmet rack
 Mall guide
 Smoking zones
 Wheel chair
 Shoe shine
 Lost and found
 ATM machines
 Babysitting rooms
 Drinking water
 Bowling game
 Garment alteration

Parking and Transportation
 2500 + parking spaces
 Parking for expectant mothers
 12 storey car and bike parking

Services for differently-abled
 Parking  
 Differently-abled washrooms 
 Golf cart services

Emergency Support
 Ambulance
 First Aid

Exclusive Stores
Sephora, GAS, Charles & Keith, Bath & Bodyworks, Shizusan, Punjab Grill, Jockey, Levi’s, Asics, Casio, OPPO, Vivo, Bhooj Adda

Milestones
 June 2011- Phoenix Marketcity, Pune opens for business 
 August 2011 - First Zara Store of Pune opens for business   
 October 2016 - First H&M Store of Pune opens for business   
 December 2017 - Asia’s Largest Jack and Jones Store   
 April 2018 - First SOCIAL restaurant in Pune

Phoenix Décors
Phoenix Marketcity Pune has had a spectrum of decors for the various festivities and celebrations that took place there.

The Royal Affair Diwali (2019)

Phoenix Marketcity Pune provided patrons a Royal themed Diwali in 2019. With a palatial entrance lined with elephants and regal canopy, to the grand and the exquisite Sheesh Mahal, the décor was truly a master piece by the famous Bollywood art director, Nitin Chandrakant Desai.

The Lights of Hope (2020) 

The Mandala Arch, the Crystal Swan and the Lotus Pond were the three creations made for Diwali 2020. The themed décor stood apt for the trying times and representing the beacon of hope and prosperity to come.

Tree of Hope (2020) 
This Tree of Hope is a mammoth structure by Belgian artist Tomas De Bruyne. It is styled as a Beacon of Hope and Prosperity and was customized in Year 2020. The Tree of Hope reflects perseverance and faith.

Christmas Tinseltown (2019)

Phoenix Marketcity, Pune built a huge polar town at the ingress to celebrate Christmas.

The Midas Christmas (2020) 
Phoenix Marketcity, Pune decked up in a golden hue to celebrate what was aptly titled , ‘The Midas Christmas’. The frosty wave, a kinetically powered set up to portray the sway of freezing winds, to the gold themed reindeers and the crystal arch at the entry lived up to the exquisite and the elegant Midas Christmas.

Hollywood Wax of Fame (2019) 
Wax effigies of leading celebrities from Hollywood were set up all over the mall.

The Good Life Moment (2019) 
This event helped bring in the New Year by spreading happiness to New Arrivals at Pune Airport.

Aliens at Phoenix (2016) 
UFO Spotted over Phoenix Marketcity Pune  
This event had aliens standing and shopping at the Phoenix Marketcity, with a UFO being spotted.

Spring Universe (2019) 

Phoenix Marketcity Pune created a Spring Universe with all the signs of Spring - from bright flowers to birds and bees and a matching decoration. Among the many seasonal touches, was the legendary 1948 Aston Martin at the Marketcity went from a vintage look to a spring makeover. It was also rechristened Polk -A-Dot Aston after the pink polka dotted look given to it. The family scooter also got a yellow Spring makeover. The specially created Bee Hive and the Butterfly Dome added the classic Spring seasonal touch

Monsoon Décor 

The monsoon décor is an annual monsoon event at Phoenix Marketcity that captures the outdoor monsoon beauty and abundance, indoors. It has specially designed life-size pieces and props like the ‘Lotus Pond’ – an assembly of flowers, dragonflies, frogs and crystals with water droplets. This is followed by a Mushroom Landscape with a variety of colorful mushrooms in different shapes and sizes accompanied by large-sized snails and dragonflies. This is one of the popular ‘bring-you-closer-to-nature’ events at Phoenix Marketcity

Eight wonders from Sand 
Phoenix Marketcity created the eight wonders of the world in sand. The replicas were intricately crafted to mimic even the subtle nuances of the life size inspirations.

Sea World by Kobi
Kobi is a world-renowned balloon artist who created a sea theme at Phoenix Marketcity by creating sea creatures with 15,000 balloons in different colours, shapes and sizes. The installations depicted the underwater life and had various works of art such as Black & White Whale (13ft), Oval Aquarium (20ft) Octopus of size (15ft) Mermaid on rock (10ft) among many others. The Balloon Sea Theme had on-ground and suspended displays and went on for a week.

I Love Pune  
Phoenix Marketcity Pune started an activity of #ILOVEPune as an engagement activity on Valentine’s Day. This activity had mall-visitors to tweet the ‘reasons why they love Pune’ on the Phoenix Marketcity Pune twitter handle.  
In the third year, the purely engagement activity was used for a social cause, where Phoenix Marketcity would pay a rupee for every tweet, to an NGO which worked for visually impaired children. The #ILovePune activity drew in support for three years and is a popular activity.

Phoenix Marketcity Intellectual Properties (IPs)
Phoenix Marketcity, Pune have launched various events, festivals, awards, competitions, shows and events that eventually became intellectual properties

Phoenix Style Icon Season 1-7 (2012-2019)
Phoenix Style Icon has enjoyed a successful 7 seasons, with over 150K participants and 50+ winners in the various categories. Phoenix Style Icon has enjoyed a massive popularity not only in the Pune Metropolitan region, but also in the surrounding markets of Ahmednagar, Navi Mumbai, Kolhapur and Nasik to name a few. The recorded telecast of Season 5 to 7 have re-run on NDTV channels on the television. Phoenix Style icon has aided Phoenix Marketcity Pune build a brand of elite, luxury fashion space in Pune. The judges panel has included, Bollywood starlets like Richa Chaddha, Mughda Godse, Mahima Chaudhary among others.

Phoenix Digital Diva  
Phoenix Digital Diva season 1 and 2 centred around a social media face off amongst the biggest influencers and fashion and lifestyle bloggers.

Phoenix Leading Lady Awards (2017-2020)  

These awards were instituted in the Year 2017 to celebrate the remarkable achievements of brave and driven Indian women on the occasion of International Women’s Day. The aim of these awards was to encourage women empowerment and bridge social imbalances. Conceptualised and executed by Entre Nous and Terragni Consulting, Phoenix Marketcity presented the first edition of the awards to 17 women from different sectors like fashion, education, environment, research, art &culture, sports, business and others. Presenters and dignitaries to present awards have ranged from Bollywood celebrities like Tabu, Karisma Kapoor, Tisca Chopra, Soha Ali Khan amongst others.

Artathon (2017-19) 

Artathon is a marathon event that was initiated with a mission of Art for All. It is a week-long art fest to celebrate and promote art including painting, music, dance, literature, storytelling, terracotta, bottle painting, Gond Art, theatre and various other art forms! The festival featured a collection of artists, art stalls, creative workshops, demonstrations and art installations. There was an art flea and an attempt to be featured in Guinness Book of World Records for ‘Most contributions to a Hand Painting in 8 hours’ and Limca Book of records for the ‘Largest Painting Party’.  
The event received a Guinness World Record for most hand prints on a wall 4.5K

Cosplay Sanctum (2018-19)
Cosplay Sanctum 2018 
Phoenix Marketcity Pune in association with Sanctum Events brings all the stars from comic inspired television shows, movies and video games as cosplayers - Wolverine, Gypsy from Avengers, Transformers to Doctor octopus and more. The two-day event included cosplay parade, flea market, music performances, dance and a competition where mall visitors could come dressed as their favourite superhero and participate.

Cosplay Sanctum 2019 
This was Cosplay Sanctum 2.0. The event repeated its predecessor’s popular agenda and improved on it. This included a Cosplay Parade, flea market, music, dance and a competition which had participants come in as their favourite superheroes.

Brandopoly (2015) 
Brandopoly 
In Year 2015, Phoenix Marketcity had a life-sized game Brandopoly – this was Monopoly with a brand twist. Mall visitors could play the game with life-sized dice. This had the participation of known brands like Lee, Spykar. The game also had a fashion quiz that tested the fashion quotient of visitors.

Human Claw Machine (November-2018)  
The Human Claw Machine was a game event hosted in the Year 2018 at the Phoenix Marketcity in Pune. On shopping for a certain amount, shoppers could participate in the game and take back free gifts during the game with their ‘claws’ Over 500 shoppers participated in the game over 5 days.

Supercar Fest - 2017/18/19 
The event features the world’s luxury supercars like Ferrari, Audi, Ford Mustang, Rolls-Royce, and more. Supercar Fest has completed three seasons so far and aims at bringing supercar enthusiasts to see the world’s supercars under one roof.

Phoenix Fountainhead– Corporate Towers

Phoenix Mills Ltd started work on Phoenix Fountainhead – Corporate Towers in the Year 2016. Phoenix Fountainhead has 3 towers, which would add a cumulative space of 0.83 million sq. ft. to Phoenix Properties. Tower 1 was completed in Year 2018 and Towers 2 and 3 completed in Year 2021.

Phoenix Gift Card
Phoenix has launched a gift card starting at INR 1000 with a 1-year validity. It is valid across 346+ brands at Phoenix Marketcity Pune and across 8 Phoenix Malls in the 6 cities. The Phoenix Gift Card can be used for multiple occasions like rewards and recognition, long service awards, festival gifting, partner and employee engagement.

References 

Shopping malls in Pune
2011 establishments in Maharashtra
Shopping malls established in 2011